Teguise may refer to:
Teguise (municipality), on the island of Lanzarote in the Canary Islands
Teguise (village), on the island of Lanzarote in the Canary Islands
CD Teguise, a football team on the island of Lanzarote in the Canary Islands